The 1920 Dublin County Council election was held on Monday, 7 June 1920.

The county was divided into four electoral divisions: Clondalkin (3 councillors), Kingstown (5 councillors), Rathmines (7 councillors), and Swords (4 councillors).

One of the most notable events of the election was the defeat of P.J. O'Neill J.P. in Swords. O'Neill had been Chairman of the council since its creation in 1899. Mr J. J. Lawlor, the outgoing Chairman of South Dublin RDC, was also defeated.

Council results

Division results

Clondalkin Electoral Division

Kingstown Electoral Division

Rathmines Electoral Division

Some of the Sinn Féin team formed an electoral group (The Cuala Group) as follows Alf McGloughlin, Thomas O'Connor, Christopher O'Kelly, Michael Stafford and George Walsh.

Swords Electoral Division

References

1920 Irish local elections
Elections in County Dublin